USS Rockdale (AK-208) was an  that was constructed for the US Navy during the closing period of World War II. She served with distinction in the Pacific Ocean theatre of operations and returned home in 1946 to be placed into the "mothball" fleet and sold in 1947.

Construction
Rockdale was laid down 15 January 1944, under US Maritime Commission (MARCOM) contract, MC hull 2162, by Leathem D. Smith Shipbuilding Company, Sturgeon Bay, Wisconsin; launched 1 October 1944; sponsored by Mrs. William R. Crawford; acquired by the Navy from MARCOM on loan-charter basis 5 June 1945; and commissioned at Galveston, Texas, 26 June 1945.

Service history

World War II service
Following shakedown off Galveston, Texas, Rockdale got underway from Gulfport, Mississippi, for the Panama Canal. Transiting the Canal 27 July, she proceeded to Hollandia, New Guinea, where she arrived 2 September to unload her cargo. On 9 September she steamed for Australia, reaching Brisbane 17 September. She got underway for Manus Island 25 September arriving 3 October. Underway the next day, she made Saipan on the 10th.

Rockdale got underway on 13 October for Okinawa where she arrived 5 days later. On 1 November she sailed for the Mariana Islands and operated in that island group until getting underway for the Panama Canal on 13 January 1946. She transited the Canal on 20 February and arrived Norfolk, Virginia, on 1 March.

Post-war inactivation
Rockdale decommissioned there 22 March, was returned to the War Shipping Administration on the 26th for lay-up in the James River, and was struck from the Navy List 12 April 1946.

Merchant service
Rockdale was sold, 11 February 1947, to Nerlof Andersens A/S, of Norway, for $693,862.00. She was wrecked and scrapped in 1969.

Notes 

Citations

Bibliography 

Online resources

External links

 

Alamosa-class cargo ships
Ships built in Sturgeon Bay, Wisconsin
1944 ships
World War II auxiliary ships of the United States
Rockdale County, Georgia